Taeniochromis holotaenia is a species of cichlid endemic to Lake Malawi in East Africa where it is widespread at depths of from .  This fish can reach a length of  TL.  It can also be found in the aquarium trade.

References

External links 
 Photograph

Haplochromini
Fish of Lake Malawi
Taxa named by Charles Tate Regan
Taxonomy articles created by Polbot
Fish described in 1922